A bad guy or villain is a type of character in fiction and other narratives.

Bad Guy or Bad Guys or variation, may also refer to:

Film 
 Bad Guy (1937 film), a film starring Virginia Grey
 Bad Guys, a 1986 film starring Adam Baldwin
 Bad Guys, a 2000 film starring James Russo
 Bad Guy (2001 film), a South Korean film by Kim Ki-duk
 Bad Guys, a 2009 film distributed by Maya Entertainment
 The Bad Guys: Reign of Chaos, a 2019 South Korean crime film
 The Bad Guys (film), a 2022 animated film based on Aaron Blabey's graphic novel series of the same name

Television 
 Bad Guy (TV series), a 2010 South Korean TV series
 Bad Guys (TV series), a 2014 South Korean TV series
 Bad Guys, a 2022 Thai spin-off action-thriller series based on the 2014 iteration of the Korean series
 The Bad Guy, a 2022 Italian series
 "Bad Guys" (Stargate SG-1), an episode of Stargate SG-1

Music 
 "Bad Guy" (Eminem song), from the 2013 album The Marshall Mathers LP 2
 "Bad Guy" (Billie Eilish song), from the 2019 album When We All Fall Asleep, Where Do We Go?
 "Bad Guy", from the Shining Time Station episode Bully for Mr. Conductor by Richard Bernstein
 Bad Guy (album), an album by South Korean pop and R&B singer Rain
 The Bad Guys (album), a 2003 jazz album by Roscoe Mitchell

Other uses 
 Scott Hall (wrestler) (born 1958), professional wrestler nicknamed "The Bad Guy" when using the ring name Razor Ramon
 The Bad Guys (book series), a children's graphic novel series by Aaron Blabey
 Sonic the Hedgehog: Bad Guys, a miniseries spin-off of the IDW Publishing series Sonic the Hedgehog

See also 

 
 
 
 
 Bad Boy (disambiguation)
 Villain (disambiguation)